Niphoparmena convexa is a species of beetle in the family Cerambycidae. It was described by Stephan von Breuning in 1939.

It's 5 mm long and 1¼ mm wide, and its type locality is Mount Meru, Tanzania.

References

convexa
Beetles described in 1939
Taxa named by Stephan von Breuning (entomologist)